Kenneth Christian Skates MS (born 2 April 1976) is a Welsh Labour politician. Skates has represented the constituency of Clwyd South in the Senedd since the election of 2011. He is an alumnus of the University of Cambridge, and worked as a journalist prior to becoming a politician. In September 2014 he became the deputy minister for Culture, Tourism and Sport. From May 2016 to December 2018 he was the Cabinet Secretary for Economy, Infrastructure and Skills, and was the Minister for Economy, Transport and North Wales until he stood down on 13 May 2021.

Early life and career
Skates was born in Wrexham, Wales, and attended Ysgol y Waun in Gwernaffield and the Alun School, Mold, where he studied A-levels in physics, maths, English and politics. After achieving four A grades he went to Sidney Sussex College, Cambridge to study social and political sciences, specialising in European regional policy and economics.

After graduating, Skates took a gap-period in the United States, before joining The Leader (Wrexham) newspaper. He studied for his NVQ in journalism at Yale College, Wrexham, and then went freelance working for the Daily Express.

Politics
Whilst working as a freelance journalist, Skates began working as office manager for Mark Tami, Welsh Labour MP for Alyn and Deeside. Skates was the lead Labour candidate for the North Wales regional seat in 2007 but wasn't elected. In 2011 he stood and was elected with 42% of the vote in Clwyd South, and was successfully re-elected in 2016.

In 2012 he was one of four MSs to stand up in the Senedd chamber to talk about their experiences with mental health problems.

In June 2013, Skates was appointed by Welsh First Minister Carwyn Jones as Deputy Minister for Skills and Technology. In a reshuffle in September 2014 he was made Deputy Minister for Culture, Tourism and Sport in September 2014, replacing John Griffiths.

Following his re-election as MS for Clwyd South in the May 2016 Senedd elections, Ken Skates was promoted to Cabinet Secretary for Economy, Infrastructure and Skills in the Welsh Government.

In the formation of the Drakeford government in December 2018, Skates was appointed Minister for Economy, Transport and North Wales. After the May 2021 Senedd elections, Skates stepped down from the government, and his role was split into two. Vaughan Gething became the new Minister for the Economy, while Lesley Griffiths took over responsibility for North Wales as the new Minister for Rural Affairs and North Wales.

References

External links
 
 Official website
 National Assembly for Wales – Assembly Member details

1976 births
Living people
People educated at Alun School, Mold
Alumni of Sidney Sussex College, Cambridge
Labour Co-operative members of the Senedd
Wales AMs 2011–2016
Wales MSs 2016–2021
Wales MSs 2021–2026
Welsh republicans